A Pulju moraine (Swedish: Pulju-morän) is a type of moraine found in northern Finland. Pulju moraines were first identified as distinct moraine type in 1967 by Finnish geologist Raimo Kujansuu who noticed moraines that resembled Veiki moraines as those described by Gunnar Hoppe in 1952 but were smaller. Raimo Kujansuu described Pulju moraines with the following words:

Together with Veiki moraines Pulju moraines form landscapes of the type "ice-walled lake plains".

See also
Pulju Wilderness Area
Terminal moraine
List of glacial moraines

References

Glacial deposits of Finland
Moraines of Europe
Landforms of Lapland (Finland)
Landforms of Finland
Moraines